Emily Frances Fletcher (1845-1923) was an American botanist notable for collecting plants in New England.

Biography 
Fletcher was born on January 17, 1845, in Westford, Massachusetts. She attended the Westford Academy in Westford.

References

1845 births
1923 deaths
American botanists
American women botanists
American women scientists